Events in the year 2020 in the Federated States of Micronesia.

Incumbents 
 President: David W. Panuelo
 Vice President: Yosiwo George

Events 
Ongoing – COVID-19 pandemic in Oceania

 3 February – President David W. Panuelo signed a declaration banning Micronesian citizens from travelling to China and other affected countries.
 5 March – The country introduced a strict travel ban, banning anyone who had been in China anytime since January 2020 — or had been in any other affected country in the last 14 days — from entering Micronesia.
 18 March – All schools in the country were closed.
 14 September – It was announced that President David W. Panuelo and the leaders of Kiribati, Palau, Nauru and the Marshall Islands will be hosting an in-person meeting. President of Nauru Lionel Aingimea said the leaders agreed to attend Palau's Independence Day on October 1 as the five Pacific countries remain free of COVID-19.

Deaths

References 

2020s in the Federated States of Micronesia
Years of the 21st century in the Federated States of Micronesia
Micronesia
Micronesia